Bemerside is a rural locality in the Shire of Hinchinbrook, Queensland, Australia.

Geography 
Bemerside is bounded to the north-east and by the Seymour River, to the south-east by the Anabranch River, to the south by the Herbert River and Ripple Creek. The Anabranch River is a tidal stream that connects the Seymour River to the Herbert River.

Bemerside has the following mountains along its eastern boundary (from north to south):

 Mount Cudmore 
 Mount Separation 
 Mount Maragen 
The Girringun National Park is in the north of the locality, extending into the neighbouring localities of Rungoo and Hawkins Creek.

The Bruce Highway enters the locality from the south (Gairloch) and exits to the north (Rungoo).

The North Coast railway line enters the locality from the south (Foresthome) and exits to the north (Rungoo) with the locality served by two railway stations (from north to south):

 Hinchinbrook railway station
 Bemerside railway station, now abandoned
Ripple Creek is a neighbourhood in the south of the locality.  It presumably takes its name from the nearby watercourse Ripple Creek, a tributary of the Herbert River.

Most of the flat land is used to grow sugarcane. There is a cane tramway network to transport the harvested sugarcane to the Macknade sugar mill in neighbouring Macknade for crushing.

History 
The locality takes its name from the Bemerside Sugar Mill, established in 1873 and named after the town of Bermersyde (note the different spelling) in Scotland, which was associated with the Haig family who originally owned the sugar mill in conjunction with the Miles family.

Ripple Creek Provisional school opened on 19 June 1893. On 1 June 1909, it became Ripple Creek State School. In 1931 and 1932 there were temporary closures. It closed permanently on 16 December 1995. It was on Fulton Drive.

Education 
There are no schools in Bemerside. The nearest government primary schools are Macknade State School in neighbouring Macknade to the east and Ingham State School in Ingham to the south. The nearest government secondary school is Ingham State High School, also in Ingham.

Attractions 
Hinchinbrook Lookout is on Mount Cudmore Tower Road, off the Bruce Highway. It offers views across the Hinchinbrook Channel to Hinchinbrook Island.

References

Further reading
 

Shire of Hinchinbrook
Localities in Queensland